Casalarreina Club de Fútbol is a Spanish football team located in the town of Casalarreina, autonomous community of La Rioja. Founded in 1997 it currently plays in Tercera División – Group 16, holding home matches at Estadio Municipal El Soto with a capacity of 800 spectators.

History 
Casalarreina CF was founded in 1997. Josean Ríos became its first president. In the 2014-15 season the club played in the Tercera División for the first time but it was immediately relegated back to Regional Preferente league. In 2016 Casalarreina CF returned to the Tercera División.

Season to season

4 seasons in Tercera División

References 

Football clubs in La Rioja (Spain)
Association football clubs established in 1997
1997 establishments in Spain